Piano Quartet No. 1 may refer to:
 Piano Quartet No. 1 (Brahms)
 Piano Quartet No. 1 (Dvořák)
 Piano Quartet No. 1 (Fauré)
 Piano Quartet No. 1 (Mendelssohn)
 Piano Quartet No. 1 (Mozart)
 Piano Quartet No. 1 (Enescu)